The Journal of Cryptology is a scientific journal in the field of cryptology and cryptography. The journal is published quarterly by the International Association for Cryptologic Research. Its editor-in-chief is Vincent Rijmen.

References

External links
 Journal of Cryptology

Cryptography journals
Computer science journals
Publications with year of establishment missing
Quarterly journals